A secession referendum was held on 8 April 1933 in the Australian state of Western Australia, on the proposal that the state withdraw from the Australian Federation. The proposal won a majority of the votes, but was not legally binding. A petition to give effect to the decision was subsequently sent to the British Parliament, where a parliamentary joint select committee ruled it invalid.

Background
In November 1930, state premier James Mitchell declared his personal support for secession. A bill for a secession referendum was introduced in November 1931 and passed by the Legislative Assembly, but initially failed to pass the Legislative Council. A second bill was passed in November 1932 as the Secession Referendum Act 1932, specifying that the referendum would be held at the same time as the next state election. Secession enjoyed the strong support of the Country Party, which governed in coalition with Mitchell's Nationalist Party. The Nationalists did not take an official position, whereas the opposition Australian Labor Party (ALP) led by Philip Collier was against secession.

Questions 
Two questions were voted on at the referendum:

Question 1: Are you in favour of the State of Western Australia withdrawing from the Federal Commonwealth established under the Commonwealth of Australia Constitution Act (Imperial)?

Question 2: Are you in favour of a Convention of Representatives of equal number from each of the Australian states being summoned for the purpose of proposing such alterations in the Constitution of the Commonwealth as may appear to such Convention to be necessary?

There were 237,198 registered voters. The result on the first question was 138,653 in favour and 70,706 against.  Question Two was rejected by a vote of 119,031 to 88,275. Only six of the fifty electoral districts recorded a No vote on the first question, five of them being in the Goldfields and Kimberley regions.

Aftermath 

The Constitution of Australia, which established the Australian federation in 1901, had originally been an act of the British Parliament, and a petition was sent to it from Western Australia, asking that the Australian Constitution be changed to give effect to the separation vote. A joint select committee was set up by the British Parliament to consider the petition, and it decided that the request could not be acted upon because it did not have the support of the Australian federal government, as required by the 1931 Statute of Westminster.

Pressure for any further action was reduced by the victory of the anti-secession Labor Party in the Western Australia state election which was held on the same day as the referendum. The establishment of the Commonwealth Grants Commission in May 1933 helped alleviate some of the grievances that had motivated the secessionist movement.

Legacy 
In the many decades after the 1933 referendum, it is invoked when Western Australian industry groups publicly complain about issues with the federal government in Canberra.

See also
Secessionism in Western Australia

Notes

References

Further reading

1933 referendums
1933
Separatism in Australia
1933 in Australia
Western Australia
1930s in Western Australia
April 1933 events